Kees Quax (14 July 1905 – 18 March 1973) was a Dutch footballer. He played in three matches for the Netherlands national football team in 1926.

References

External links
 

1905 births
1973 deaths
Dutch footballers
Netherlands international footballers
Association footballers not categorized by position